Latvijas Radio 5 - Pieci.lv is part of Latvijas Radio public service broadcasting network based in Riga, Latvia. Pieci.lv is public service broadcasting for youth, combining subculture, different lifestyle and opinion leaders. Currently the network consists of nine internet only stations and a nationwide FM station.

On 15 March 2015, Pieci.lv competed in first European Radio Championship which was held in Milan. In the Championship the station was represented by Toms Grēviņš and Marta Līne.

History 
Latvijas Radio 5 - Pieci.lv was launched at 10pm on 14 July 2013. The first station to be launched was Pieci Koncerti which played exclusive live recordings from the Positivus Festival in Salacgrīva.

Stations 
Pieci.lv streams several stations, available both online and in mobile apps:
 Pieci Latvieši - Latvian bands 
 Pieci Hiti - pop music
 Pieci Rīti - replays of pieci.lv morning programmes 
 Pieci Rokeri -  Latvian and foreign rock
 Pieci Atklājumi - hits
 Pieci Bīti - club music
 Pieci Latgalieši - music in Latgalian
 Pieci Koncerti - live concerts
 Pieci Hip Hop - hip hop from around the world

Frequency

See also 
 Latvijas radio

References

External links 
 Latvijas Radio 5 - Pieci.lv homepage

Radio stations established in 2013
Radio stations in Latvia